Canyon River is a 1956 American CinemaScope Western film directed by Harmon Jones and starring George Montgomery.

It is a remake of the 1951 film The Longhorn.

Plot summary
A cattleman (George Montgomery actor) goes south to pick up breeding stock that he can cross-breed to withstand his Wyoming ranch's winters, but his foreman (Peter Graves) is in cahoots with a crooked businessman from the ranch's hometown in Wyoming. They plan to buy up ranchland in that area, do away with the cattleman (George Montgomery) and steal his herd he's driving in from Oregon or elsewhere. Near the end of the movie and before they reach a planned 'stampede to steal the cattle', Montgomery likes Graves and offers him a share of his 6,000 acre ranch and also some cattle. Graves decides this would be a great deal and tries to call off the 'crooked deal' he made with the crooked investor and his hired guns, but the cattle do stampede anyway and Graves is critically injured trying to stop them. In the end Montgomery maintains his cattle and ranch ownership. So the 'good guy' wins. On the trail drive, there had been a shortage of 'meat' to feed the crew, because the boss Montgomery wouldn't kill a beef from his herd. The crew was about to mutiny, until a 'deer' was killed and steaks were served. This main plot coincides with a romance between Montgomery and a widow (Marcia Henderson), who Graves is also in love with.

Cast
 George Montgomery as Steve Patrick
 Marcia Henderson as Janet Hale
 Peter Graves as Bob Andrews
 Richard Eyer as Chuck Hale
 Walter Sande as Maddox
 Robert J. Wilke as Joe Graycoe
 Alan Hale Jr. as George Lynch
 John Harmon as Ben
 Jack Lambert as Kincaid
 William Fawcett as Jergens

References

External links
 
 
 

1956 films
American Western (genre) films
1956 Western (genre) films
CinemaScope films
1950s English-language films
1950s American films
Allied Artists films